Eric Darnell Wright (born April 23, 1984), better known by his stage names Lil Eazy-E and Lil Eazy, is an American rapper. He is best known for being the son of Eazy-E. He is the president of Rich & Ruthless Records, an entertainment and business firm for musicians and entertainers. He and his brother E3, formally known as Baby Eazy-E, also founded Rich & Ruthless Cannabis, a cannabis grower and supplier.

Career
Lil Eazy E was born Eric Darnell Wright in Compton, California on April 23, 1984, and is the son of popular rapper Eazy-E. Wright was mostly raised by his grandmother, however on the weekends he would see his father. He was 10 when his father succumbed to HIV/AIDS. In 2003, he entered the rap scene with his mixtapes and songs he wrote. He later signed with Virgin Records.

On September 13, 2012, it was reported that Lil Eazy-E was in contract negotiations with Death Row Records. The artist backed off from the deal, stating he would always be "Ruthless Records For Life"

In 2015, he became the president of Rich & Ruthless Records and later created Rich & Ruthless Cannabis. On May 17, 2021, he released the song "It Ain't Over."

Discography

Mixtapes
2006: Cali Untouchable Radio 14: Rebirth Of Gangsta Rap
2006: This Ain't a Game [Hosted by Mixtape Messiah]

Singles
2005: Gangsta Sh**
2021: It Ain't Over

Also featured on
"A Lil' Eazier Said" – Eazy-E – Eternal E (1995)
"Lets Get It Crackin'" (with RizzyBoy) – True Crime: Streets of LA (2003)
"Consequences" – True Crime: Streets of LA (2003)
"We the Shit" (with Caviar) – O.G. Daddy V – O.G. Daddy V Presents Compton's Finest Mixtape Volume 1 (2003)
"My Confession" – The Game – Nigga Witta Attitude (2006)
"Men of Respect" (with Jim Jones & Rell) Papoose – The Fourth Quarter Assassin (2006)
"What We Claimin' (Edited)" – DJ Nik Bean – Streetz Of L.A. 6 (2008)
Rap or Die Vol. 3
September 7 – Western Hospitality 2
September 7 – Western Hospitality 3
"Come Outta Compton" – Spider Loc – Bangadoshish (G-Unit West Special Edition) (2006)
"The New West Coast" (with Mr. Capone-E) – Thug Radio Mixtape 15: Hard As Steel (2006)
"This Ain't a Game" (feat. Bone Thugs-N-Harmony) – Waist Deep (2006)
"Outside" (The Game featuring E-40, Mvrcus Blvck and Lil Eazy-E) - The Documentary 2.5 (2015)
"Sick Kidz" (Violent J featuring Nova Rockafeller, Lil Eazy-E & Young Wicked) – Tour Single (2016)
L.W.A. (Mr. Criminal featuring Lil Eazy-E) - L.W.A: Latin with Attitude (2016)
Lil Eazy (Blue Intro) (Mr. Criminal featuring Lil Eazy-E) - L.W.A: Latin with Attitude (2016)
Kickin' Back Being Blue (Mr. Criminal featuring Glasses Malone, Big Tray Deee, Lil Eazy-E, Tha Chill, Big 2da Boy) - L.W.A: Latin with Attitude (2016)
Studio Gangstas (Spice 1 featuring Lil Eazy-E, MC Eiht, Nawfside Outlaw) - Platinum O.G. (2019)

Filmography

References

21st-century African-American musicians
21st-century American male musicians
21st-century American rappers
1984 births
Activists from California
African-American male rappers
Crips
Gangsta rappers
HIV/AIDS activists
Living people
Musicians from Compton, California
Rappers from Los Angeles
20th-century African-American people